Archduchess Maria Carolina of Austria (Maria Carolina Ernestina Antoina Johanna Josefa; 12 January 1740 – 25 January 1741) was the third child and daughter of Maria Theresa, Holy Roman Empress, and Francis I, Holy Roman Emperor.

Biography
In Maria Theresa's third pregnancy, expectations for a male heir were intense. The disappointment was correspondingly great when, on 12 January 1740, a third daughter was born. She was immediately baptized on the evening of her birth.

After the death of her older sister Maria Elisabeth on 7 June, she became second in the line of succession, preceded only by her older sister Maria Anna. Five months later, on 20 October, her grandfather Emperor Charles VI died and her mother inherited the Austrian and Bohemian lands, and with this began the War of the Austrian Succession.

On 24 January 1741, the young Archduchess suddenly became gravely ill with violent seizures, dying around noon of the next day. The cause of death was believed to be either tetany or spasmophilia; however, at the time of her death an autopsy was carried out on the corpse, but no explanation was given for her demise. She was buried in the Maria Theresa Vault at the Imperial Crypt, Vienna.

Two other sisters were named after her: another short-lived one (born and died in 1748) and another (born in 1752), later Queen of Naples and Sicily.

Ancestry

References

Bibliography
Elfriede Iby: "Marie-Thérèse, biographie d'une souveraine".

1740 births
1741 deaths
House of Habsburg-Lorraine
Austrian princesses
Burials at the Imperial Crypt
Burials at St. Stephen's Cathedral, Vienna
18th-century Austrian women
Daughters of emperors
Children of Maria Theresa
Royalty and nobility who died as children
Daughters of kings